R13 is a small-molecule flavonoid and orally active, potent, and selective agonist of the tropomyosin receptor kinase B (TrkB) – the main signaling receptor for the neurotrophin brain-derived neurotrophic factor (BDNF) – which is under development for the potential treatment of Alzheimer's disease. It is a structural modification and prodrug of tropoflavin (7,8-DHF) with improved potency and pharmacokinetics, namely oral bioavailability and duration. The compound is a replacement for the earlier tropoflavin prodrug R7 and has similar properties to it. It was developed because while R7 displayed a good drug profile in animal studies, it showed almost no conversion into tropoflavin in human liver microsomes. In contrast to R7, R13 is readily hydrolyzed into tropoflavin in human liver microsomes.

See also
 List of investigational antidepressants
 Tropomyosin receptor kinase B § Agonists

References

External links
 7,8-Dihydoxyflavone and 7,8-substituted flavone derivatives, compositions, and methods related thereto (US9975868B2)

Antidementia agents
Carbamates
Esters
Experimental drugs
Flavones
Neuroprotective agents
Nootropics
Prodrugs
TrkB agonists